Alma is a settlement in Prince Edward Island.

Alma, an unincorporated area, is located in Prince County in the western portion of Prince Edward Island, NW. of Alberton. Its precise location is N 46°52', W 64°07'.

Communities in Prince County, Prince Edward Island